Alex Barnett may refer to:

 Alex Barnett (cricketer) (born 1970), English cricketer
 Alex Barnett (mathematician) (born 1972), English applied mathematician and musician
 Alex Barnett (basketball) (born 1986), American basketball player